Tuula is a village in Saue Parish, Harju County in northern Estonia.

References

Villages in Harju County